(1909 – December 17, 1933) was a Japanese swimmer who competed at the 1928 Summer Olympics in Amsterdam.

Born in Yamanashi Prefecture, Sada grew up in Nagoya and was a graduate of Meiji University. Sada was a member of the Japanese team which won the silver medal for the 4 × 200 meter freestyle relay event at the 1928 Amsterdam Olympics.
After the Olympics, he went to work for Hankyu, but died due to a disease in 1933.

External links
profile

1909 births
1933 deaths
Sportspeople from Yamanashi Prefecture
Meiji University alumni
Olympic swimmers of Japan
Swimmers at the 1928 Summer Olympics
Olympic silver medalists for Japan
Japanese male freestyle swimmers
Medalists at the 1928 Summer Olympics
Olympic silver medalists in swimming
20th-century Japanese people